Mucosa-associated lymphoid tissue lymphoma translocation protein 1 is a protein that in humans is encoded by the MALT1 gene. It's the human paracaspase.

Function 

Genetic ablation of the paracaspase gene in mice and biochemical studies have shown that paracaspase is a crucial protein for T and B lymphocytes activation. It has an important role in the activation of the transcription factor NF-κB, in the production of interleukin-2 (IL-2) and in T and B lymphocytes proliferation Two alternatively spliced transcript variants encoding different isoforms have been described for this gene.

In addition, a role for paracaspase has been shown in the innate immune response mediated by the zymosan receptor Dectin-1 in macrophages and dendritic cells, and in response to the stimulation of certain G protein-coupled receptors.

Sequence analysis proposes that paracaspase has an N-terminal death domain, two central immunoglobulin-like domains involved in the binding to the B-cell lymphoma 10 (Bcl10) protein and a caspase-like domain. The death domain and immunoglobulin-like domains participate in binding to BCL10. Activation of MALT1 downstream NF-κB signaling and protease activity occurs when BCL10/MALT1 gets recruited to an activated CARD-CC family protein (CARD9, -10, -11 or -14) in a so-called CBM (CARD-CC/BCL10/MALT1) signaling complex.

Paracaspase has been shown to have proteolytic activity through its caspase-like domain in T lymphocytes. Cysteine 464 and histidine 414 are crucial for this activity. Like metacaspases, the paracaspase cleaves substrates after an arginine residue. To date, several paracaspase substrates have been described (see below). Bcl10 is cut after arginine 228. This removes the last five amino acids at the C-terminus and is crucial for T cell adhesion to fibronectin, but not for NF-κB activation and IL-2 production. However, using a peptide-based inhibitor (z-VRPR-fmk) of the paracaspase proteolytic activity, it has been shown that this activity is required for a sustain NF-κB activation and IL-2 production, suggesting that paracaspase may have others substrates involved in T cell-mediated NF-κB activation. A20, a deubiquitinase, has been shown to be cut by paracaspase in Human and in mouse. Cells expressing an uncleavable A20 mutant is however still capable to activate NF-κB, but cells expressing the C-terminal or the N-terminal A20 cleavage products activates more NF-κB than cells expressing wild-type A20, indicating that cleavage of A20 leads to its inactivation. Since A20 has been described has an inhibitor of NF-κB, this suggests that paracaspase-mediated A20 cleavage in T lymphocytes is necessary for a proper NF-κB activation.

By targeting paracaspase proteolytic activity, it might be possible to develop new drugs that might be useful for the treatment of certain lymphomas or autoimmune disorders.

Interactions 

MALT1 has been shown to interact with BCL10, TRAF6 and SQSTM1/p62.

Protease substrates 

MALT1 (PCASP1) is part of the paracaspase family and shows proteolytic activity. Since many of the substrates are involved in regulation of inflammatory responses, the protease activity of MALT1 has emerged as an interesting therapeutic target. Currently known protease substrates are (in order of reported discovery):

Specifically by the oncogenic IAP2-MALT1 fusion:
 NIK
 LIMA1

Protease inhibitors 
Since MALT1 protease activity is a promising therapeutic target, several different screenings have been performed which have resulted in different types of protease inhibitors. There is active competition between multiple pharma companies and independent research groups in drug development against the MALT1 protease activity.

 Substrate peptide-based active-site inhibitor: Initially described with the metacaspase inhibitor VRPR-fmk. Others have developed peptide inhibitors based on the optimal peptide sequence (LVSR) or further chemical modifications.  Janssen Pharmaceutica is currently performing a clinical trial with this class of inhibitors.
 Phenothiazine compounds like mepazine and chlorpromazine (which have been used clinically for neurological/psychological conditions) have been found to be allosteric inhibitors of MALT1 protease activity.
 Biperiden, like phenothiazines, act as a MALT1 protease inhibitor and show promising results against pancreatic cancer.
 A molecular modeling approach led to the development of the small molecule active site inhibitor MI-2.
 Analogs of β-Lapachone have been identified as MALT1 protease inhibitors.
 Quinoline and thiazolopyridine allosteric MALT1 protease inhibitors have been demonstrated to work in mouse disease models.
 secondary metabolites (oxepinochromenones) from the fungus Dictyosporium show MALT1 protease inhibitory activity.
 Novartis is developing pyrazolopyrimidine derivative MALT1 protease inhibitors.
 VIB is developing MALT1 protease inhibitors in collaboration with the Leuven-based spin-off Centre for Drug Design and Discovery (CD3) 
 AstraZeneca is developing MALT1 protease inhibitors. 
 Lupin and AbbVie are developing MALT1 protease inhibitors.
 Chordia therapeutics is entering a clinical trial with a MALT1 protease inhibitor in 2020

See also 
 Paracaspase

References

Further reading

External links